Basedow is a municipality in the Mecklenburgische Seenplatte district, in Mecklenburg-Vorpommern, Germany.

References

External links
*Official website of the Basedow municipality (German)
The village of Gessin (German)

Grand Duchy of Mecklenburg-Schwerin